"Tormentor" is a single by the band Skinny Puppy. It is the first single from their album Too Dark Park, released in 1990.

Track listing

Personnel
All credits adapted from liner notes.

Skinny Puppy
Nivek Ogre – vocals
cEvin Key – synthesizers, programming, engineering, production, mixing
Dwayne Goettel – synthesizers, programming, engineering, production, mixing

Additional personnel
Dave Ogilvie – production, mixing
Ken Marshall – recording, mixing 
Greg Reely – mixing (1)
Chris Sheppard – editing
Anthony Valcic – editing
Jim Cummins – artwork

References

1990 singles
Skinny Puppy songs
1990 songs
Capitol Records singles
Songs written by cEvin Key
Songs written by Dwayne Goettel
Songs written by Dave Ogilvie